Mervent is a commune in the Vendée department in the Pays de la Loire region in western France.

Places and monuments 
 The Château de la Citardière
 The Old Castle ruins in the village,
 The church Saint-Medard
 The Mère river.
 The Mervent-Vouvant forest
 The Pierre-Brune recreation park
 The Natur’Zoo.
 The cave where Louis de Montfort  (an 18th-century catholic priest) prayed

Main sights

See also
Communes of the Vendée department

References

Communes of Vendée